The Stanway School is a mixed secondary school located in Stanway in the English county of Essex.

The school was converted to academy status in May 2013, and used to be a community school under the direct control of Essex County Council. The school continues to coordinate with Essex County Council for admissions.

The Stanway School offers the General Certificate of Secondary Education (GCSEs), Business and Technology Education Council (BTECs) and OCR Nationals as programmes of study for pupils. The school has a Humanities, Maths & Computing specialism, and offers additional courses in these subjects.

The school is part of the Stanway Federation Academy Trust with the Thomas Lord Audley School and is also part of the Sigma Trust.

Notable former pupils
Damon Albarn, musician and singer-songwriter of the bands Blur and Gorillaz
Graham Coxon, musician and guitarist of the band Blur
Natalie Jones, paralympic swimmer
Adam Miller, former footballer
Sade (singer), singer

References

External links
The Stanway School official website

Secondary schools in Essex
Academies in Essex
Educational institutions established in 1958
1958 establishments in England